A list of British films released in 1933.

A-K

L-Z

See also
 1933 in British music
 1933 in British television
 1933 in film
 1933 in the United Kingdom

References

Bibliography
 Chibnall, Steve. Quota Quickies: The Birth of the British 'B' Film. British Film Institute, 2007.
 Low, Rachael. Filmmaking in 1930s Britain. George Allen & Unwin, 1985.
 Wood, Linda. British Films, 1927-1939. British Film Institute, 1986.

External links
 

1933
Films
Lists of 1933 films by country or language
1930s in British cinema